Jonathan Weaver (born 20 January 1977 in Sunderland, England) is a British professional ice hockey defenceman for the Telford Tigers of the National Ice Hockey League (NIHL). Weaver also played for the Great Britain men's national ice hockey team.

Playing career
Weaver has spent most of his playing career in Britain, the majority of which with the current Newcastle Vipers franchise. He started playing at an early age with the Sunderland Commanches, Arrows, Tomahawks then Chiefs, then moved to the Durham Wasps in 1992 before they were moved to Newcastle in 1996 as the Cobras.

He moved to Manchester Storm in 1998 and had a brief spell in North America the following season, playing for Detroit Vipers and Mississippi Sea Wolves in the ECHL. He also spent some time at a training camp in the American Hockey League.

He returned to Britain in 2000 and moved to Scotland, playing three seasons with the Ayr Scottish Eagles before joining the Fife Flyers in 2002. Weaver returned to Newcastle in 2003, helping the team move up from the British National League to the Elite Ice Hockey League in 2005. In 2007 he was signed by EIHL champions Coventry Blaze and helped the team retain their crown. In 2010 he captained the Blaze to another EIHL title.

Weaver played for the Nottingham Panthers for the 2012–13 and 2013–14 seasons.

Weaver signed for Telford Tigers for the 2014–15 season.

Awards
 Winner of the Alan Weeks Trophy in five consecutive seasons from 2006 to 2010.
 Named to the EIHL First All-Star Team in 2008 and 2010.
 Named to the EIHL Second All-Star Team in 2009.

Career statistics

Regular season and playoffs

International

References

External links
 

1977 births
Coventry Blaze players
Detroit Vipers players
Manchester Storm (1995–2002) players
Durham Wasps players
English ice hockey defencemen
Living people
Mississippi Sea Wolves players
Newcastle Vipers players
Telford Tigers players
Sportspeople from Sunderland
British expatriate ice hockey people
Expatriate ice hockey players in the United States
English expatriate sportspeople in the United States